LRSD may refer to:
 Little Rock School District
 Louis Riel School Division